Trigonopteryx is a genus of Asian grasshoppers: typical of the family Trigonopterygidae.

Subgenera and Species 
The Orthoptera Species file lists two subgenera:
 subgenus Celebopteryx Ramme, 1941
Trigonopteryx celebesia Willemse, 1931
Trigonopteryx willemsei Ramme, 1941
 subgenus Trigonopteryx Charpentier, 1845
Trigonopteryx hopei Westwood, 1841
Trigonopteryx punctata Charpentier, 1841 - type species (locality Java)
Trigonopteryx sumatrana Willemse, 1930

References

External links 
 

Caelifera genera
Orthoptera of Asia